The Schippan Mystery is a 1984 Australian television film about the murder of Bertha Schippan in 1902. Directed by Di Drew, it was last of four telemovies called Verdict produced by the ABC dramatising real cases (the others being The Dean Case, The Amorous Dentist, and Who Killed Hannah Jane?). It is the only one of the four cases set outside of New South Wales.

Background 
On 1 January 1902, 13-year-old Bertha Schippan was murdered in Towitta, South Australia. Her sister, Mary, was initially arrested and tried for the crime, but was acquitted.

Cast 
Sally McKenzie - Mary Schippan
 Brandon Burke - Gustave Nitschke
Joseph Fürst - Mathias Schippan
Dorothy Alison - Mrs. Schippan
 Desiree Smith - Bertha Schippan
Michael Winchester - August Schippan
Yves Stening - Willie Schippan
Martin Vaughan - Detective Edward Priest
Arthur Dignam - Sir Josiah Symon
 Matthew O'Sullivan - Mr. Stuart

References

External links

The Schippan Mystery at AustLit
The Schippan Mystery at Screen Australia

Australian television films
1984 television films
1984 films
Films about murder
Films set in 1902
Films set in South Australia
Films directed by Di Drew
1980s English-language films